Bragi Sigurjónsson (9 November 1910 – 29 October 1995) was an Icelandic politician and former minister.

External links 

 Non auto-biography of Bragi Sigurjónsson on the parliament website

1910 births
1995 deaths
Bragi Sigurjonsson